The Lower North Province was a two-member electoral province of the Western Australian Legislative Council, located in the central and northern parts of the state. For nearly its entire existence, it had the lowest enrolment of any province in the Council. It was one of several rural seats created following the enactment of the Constitution Acts Amendment Act (No.2) 1963, and became effective on 22 May 1965.

In 1989, the province was abolished by the Acts Amendment (Electoral Reform) Act 1987, and was absorbed into the Mining and Pastoral region under the new proportional voting system.

Geography
The province was made up of two complete Legislative Assembly districts, which changed at each distribution.

Representation

Members

References
 

Former electoral provinces of Western Australia